Willie Jolley (born September 3, 1956, Washington, D.C.) is an author, radio host, speaker, singer and media personality. He is best known for his motivational best selling book, It Only Takes A Minute To Change Your Life. In 1999, he was named as one of the outstanding five speakers in the World by Toastmasters International and was also inducted into the 2012 Speaker Hall of Fame by the National Speakers Association.

Early life and education
Jolley was born in Washington, D.C. He received his Bachelor's in Art degree with specialization in psychology and sociology from The American University in 1978 and a master's degree in theology from Wesley Theological seminary. He completed his Doctorate of Ministry Degree in Faith Driven Achievement from the California Graduate School of Theology.

Career
Jolley began his career as a solo vocalist, singing jingles for companies such as Pizza Hut, Oldsmobile, and Black Entertainment Television. His voice was featured in national TV and radio jingles. He was later fired from the job and went on to become a motivational speaker. Jolley has given motivational talks to multinational corporate houses for corporate training, leadership, motivation, team-building, and personal breakthroughs.
 
He also hosts a regular show, Willie Jolley Show on SiriusXM.

Bibliography

Awards
1986- Best Male Jazz Vocalist WAMMIE (Washington Area Music Association)
1990– Best Male Jazz Vocalist WAMMIE 
1991– Best Male Inspirational Vocalist WAMMIE award
1992– Best Male Inspirational Vocalist WAMMIE award
1999– One of the Outstanding Five Speakers in the World by Toastmasters International
2012– Recipient of the Ron Brown Distinguished Leadership Award
2012– Council of Peers Award of Excellence, Speaker Hall of Fame, National Speakers Association
2013– "One of the Top 5 Leadership Speakers" by Speaking.com
2013– Business Leader of The Year by The African American Chambers of Commerce
2015 – National Champion of Business Award by Concerned Black Men National
2017 – Legends of Speaking Lifetime Achievement Award by Veterans Speakers Retreat

Appointments
Member of the National Speakers Association since 1991
President of the National Capital Speakers Association, 1995–96

References

1956 births
Living people